Yuliya Vladimirovna Menshova (born July 28, 1969) is a Russian actress and TV show host. She is the winner of the Russian national television award  TEFI  in the  Talk-show  (1999).

Biography
Was born 28 July 1969 in Moscow, USSR (now Russia).

Followed in her parents' footsteps, graduating from a theatrical academy and going to work at the Moscow Art Theater. Over a period of four years, she played a dozen leading roles and appeared in several movies. But just as everything was going right in her acting career, Menshova stepped off the stage and into the television studio as an editor. Soon she was tapped to host her own show, which in time became TV6's prime attraction.

Has often been compared to Oprah Winfrey. Her women's talk show on TV6, Ya sama (I'll Do It Myself), regularly ruled the ratings. Her father, actor and director Vladimir Menshov, won the 1980 Oscar for Best Foreign Language Film for Moscow Does not Believe in Tears, in which her mother, actress Vera Alentova, played the leading role.

Personal life
Menshova is married to actor Igor Gordin, with whom she has two children: Andrey Gordin (born 1997) and Taisia Gordina (born 2003).

Selected filmography 
 1991: Act, Manya! as Manya
 1991: The Sukhovo-Kobylin's case as Nadezhda Naryshkina
 1992: In That Area of Heaven... as Anya
 1992: Silence as Nina
 1993: If You Knew ... as Natalya Ivanovna
 1993: Picky Groom as Katya
 2007: Big Love as Kaleriya

References

External links
 

1969 births
Living people
Soviet film actresses
Russian film actresses
Russian television actresses
Actresses from Moscow
Russian television presenters
Russian theatre directors
Russian women television presenters
Moscow Art Theatre School alumni
Russian activists against the 2022 Russian invasion of Ukraine